"Wooden Heart" is a pop song recorded by Elvis Presley. The composition is based on a German folk song "Muss i denn" (lit. Must I then) and it was featured in the 1960 Elvis Presley film G.I. Blues. The song was a hit single for Presley in the UK Singles Chart, reaching No. 1 for six weeks in March and April 1961.

Background
The song was published by Elvis Presley's company Gladys Music, Inc. In the United States, it was released in November 1964 as the B-side to "Blue Christmas". Presley performed the song live during his Dinner Show concert at the Hilton Hotel in Las Vegas in 1975, a recording available on the Elvis Presley live album Dinner At Eight.

A cover version by Joe Dowell on the Smash Records label made it to number one in the US at the end of August 1961, knocking Bobby Lewis' "Tossin' and Turnin'" off the number-one spot on the Billboard Hot 100 after seven weeks. Dowell's version also spent three weeks at number one on the Easy Listening chart.

"Wooden Heart", created by Fred Wise, Ben Weisman, Kay Twomey and German bandleader Bert Kaempfert, was based on a German folk song, "Muss i denn", originating from the Rems Valley in Württemberg, south-west Germany, and arranged by Friedrich Silcher. "Wooden Heart" features several lines from the original folk song. Marlene Dietrich recorded a version of the song in the original German  sometime before 1958, pre-dating Presley, which appears as a B-side on a 1959 version of her single "Lili Marlene", released by Philips in association with Columbia Records. The Elvis Presley version was published by Gladys Music, Elvis Presley's publishing company. Bobby Vinton recorded his version in 1975 with those lines translated into Polish.

The Elvis Presley version features two sections in German, the first being the first four lines: "". The second section is towards the end and is based on a translation of the English version (therefore not appearing in the original German folk lyrics):  ("Be good to me, be good to me, be to me how you really should, how you really should...").

Chart history

Elvis Presley

Weekly charts

Year-end charts

Joe Dowell

Gus Backus

Editions
(US) "Blue Christmas" b/w "Wooden Heart" Released: November 1964, RCA 447-0720

Tom Petty and the Heartbreakers Released on their 2015 Album Nobody's Children of previously unreleased material

Bobby Vinton released it as a 45 single on ABC Records in 1975—U.S. #58

References

External links
Elvis News Network – G.I. Blues
Joe Dowell biography
"", lyrics and translation
 Joe Dowell Collection, McLean County Museum of History

1959 songs
1960 singles
1961 singles
Elvis Presley songs
UK Singles Chart number-one singles
Number-one singles in Australia
Number-one singles in Norway
Billboard Hot 100 number-one singles
Songs with music by Bert Kaempfert
Songs with lyrics by Fred Wise (songwriter)
Songs with music by Ben Weisman
Songs with lyrics by Kay Twomey
Songs written for films
RCA Records singles
Smash Records singles
1950s ballads
Pop ballads
Folk ballads
Macaronic songs